The 1998 Grand Prix motorcycle racing season was the 50th F.I.M. Road Racing World Championship season.

Season summary
Mick Doohan and Honda continued to dominate the 500 class with the Australian taking 8 victories and Honda winning all but one race. Simon Crafar winning the British Grand Prix for Yamaha's lone victory. After being shocked by 500 class rookie Max Biaggi's opening round victory in the Japanese Grand Prix, Doohan went on to claim his fifth world championship in as many years, finishing off the season with four consecutive wins.

A controversial finish marked the 250 title race. Aprilia teammates Tetsuya Harada and Loris Capirossi both went into the final race in Argentina with a chance to win the title, Capirossi leading Harada by 4 points. With one corner to go, Harada was in second, with Capirossi third, which would have given Harada the championship on tiebreak. Entering the final turn, his bike was struck from behind by Capirossi's machine, sending both riders off the track. Valentino Rossi took the win with Capirossi recovering to finish in second and claiming the title. Afterwards, Aprilia would release Capirossi from his contract.

Kazuto Sakata would win his second 125 title for Aprilia after a tight battle with Tomomi Manako and Marco Melandri.

1998 Grand Prix season calendar
The following Grands Prix were scheduled to take place in 1998:

†† = Saturday race

Calendar changes
 The Malaysian Grand Prix and Japanese Grand Prix swapped places, with Japan hosting the opening round Grand Prix, instead of Malaysia.
 The Malaysian Grand Prix moved from the Shah Alam Circuit to the Johor Circuit.
 The German Grand Prix moved from the Nürburgring to the Sachsenring because of the very low number of spectators who came to view the race there.
 The Austrian Grand Prix was removed from the calendar, mainly because of a low number of spectators.
 The Rio Grand Prix was removed from the calendar because of organisational problems.
 The Indonesian Grand Prix was removed from the calendar because of 1997 Asian Financial Crisis that affected the country and was replaced by the Argentine Grand Prix.
 The Madrid Grand Prix was added as an extra, one-off Grand Prix.

1998 Grand Prix season results

†† = Saturday race

Participants

500cc participants

Standings

Riders' standings

500cc

Scoring system
Points were awarded to the top fifteen finishers. A rider had to finish the race to earn points.

 Riders marked with light blue background were eligible for Rookie of the Year award.

250cc

Scoring system
Points were awarded to the top fifteen finishers. A rider had to finish the race to earn points.

 Riders marked with light blue background were eligible for Rookie of the Year award.

125cc

Scoring system
Points were awarded to the top fifteen finishers. A rider had to finish the race to earn points.

 Riders marked with light blue background were eligible for Rookie of the Year award.

Manufacturers' standings

500cc

250cc

125cc

References
 Büla, Maurice & Schertenleib, Jean-Claude (2001). Continental Circus 1949-2000. Chronosports S.A. 

Grand Prix motorcycle racing seasons
Grand Prix motorcycle racing season